The 2020–21 Scottish League One was the eighth season of Scottish League One, the third tier of Scottish football. The season commenced later than usual, on the October 17th, being played over a shortened 22 game period due to the ongoing coronavirus pandemic.

Ten teams contested the league: Airdrieonians, Clyde, Cove Rangers, Dumbarton, East Fife, Falkirk, Forfar Athletic, Montrose, Partick Thistle and Peterhead.

On 11 January 2021, the league was suspended for three weeks due to the COVID-19 pandemic. On 29 January 2021, the suspension was extended until at least 14 February. In March 2021, the Scottish Government gave permission for the league to resume. On 4 March, League One and Two clubs proposed shortening the season to 22 matches, with each team playing all other teams twice, followed by a split in the table to determine the final four matches. The clubs suggested a restart date of 20 March, which was approved by the SPFL.

Teams
The following teams changed division after the 2019–20 season.

To League One
Promoted from League Two
Cove Rangers
Relegated from the Championship
Partick Thistle

From League One
Relegated to League Two
Stranraer
Promoted to the Championship
Raith Rovers

Stadia and locations

Personnel and kits

Managerial changes

League summary

League table

Results
Teams play each other two times, making a total of 90 games, with each team playing 18, the league then splits in half for a further 4 matches. This was reduced from the normal 36 due to the coronavirus pandemic.

Matches 1–18

Post-Split Fixtures (Matches 19–22)

Top half

Bottom half

Season statistics

Scoring

Top scorers

Source:

Hat-tricks

Most assists

Source:

Attendances
Games were mostly played behind closed doors due to the COVID-19 pandemic. Limited attendance was allowed at some grounds with strict conditions under the Scottish Government Tier system, dependent on the club's geographical location.

Awards

League One play-offs
The second bottom team, Dumbarton, entered into a 4-team playoff with the 2nd-4th placed teams in 2020–21 Scottish League Two. Edinburgh City along with Elgin City and Stranraer secured playoff spots.

Semi-final

First leg

Second leg

Final

First leg

Second leg

References

External links
Official website

Scottish League One seasons
3
3
Scot
Scottish League One